The Perfect House is a 2011 Indonesian thriller film directed by Affandi Abdul Rachman and produced by Vera Lasut.The film starring Endy Arfian, Bella Esperance, Mike Lucock and Wanda Nizar in the lead roles.

Cast
 Endy Arfian
 Bella Esperance
 Mike Lucock
 Wanda Nizar
 Cathy Sharon

References

External links
 

2010s Indonesian-language films
2011 films
2011 thriller films
Indonesian thriller films